Molière Award for Best Supporting Actor. Winners and nominees.

 1987 : Pierre Arditi in The Rehearsal  (La Répétition ou l'Amour puni)
Jean-Michel Dupuis in Conversations After a Burial  (Conversations après un enterrement)
Patrick Raynal in As Is  (Tel quel)
Jean-Paul Roussillon in Conversations After a Burial  (Conversations après un enterrement)
Didier Sandre in The Marriage of Figaro  (La Folle Journée ou le Mariage de Figaro)
 1988 : Pierre Vaneck in The Secret  (Le Secret)
Fabrice Eberhard in Death of a Salesman  (Mort d'un commis voyageur)
Jean-Paul Farré in The Metamorphosis  (La Métamorphose)
Jacques Jouanneau in Les Cahiers Tango
Fabrice Luchini in The Secret  (Le Secret)
 1989 : Étienne Chicot in Une absence
Claude Evrard in A Month in the Country  (Un mois à la campagne)
Henri Garcin in Just Between Ourselves  (Entre nous soit dit)
François Lalande in Home  (Le Foyer)
Michel Robin in L'Imposture
 1990 : Michel Robin in The Passage of Winter  (La Traversée de l'hiver)
Gérard Caillaud in Les Palmes de Monsieur Schutz
Martin Lamotte in A Fly in the Ointment  (Un fil à la patte)
Roger Mirmont in La Celestina  (La Célestine)
Henri Virlogeux in Ivanov
 1991 : Jean-Paul Roussillon in Zone libre
Jacques Bonnaffé in La Fonction
Jean-Paul Farré in Les Fourberies de Scapin
Mario Gonzalez in Les Fourberies de Scapin
Georges Wilson in Eurydice
 1992 : Robert Hirsch in Le Misanthrope
Jean-Pierre Darroussin in Cuisine et dépendances
Maurice Garrel in Making It Better  (C'était bien)
Gérard Hernandez in No Hard Feelings  (Sans rancune)
Sam Karmann in Cuisine et dépendances
 1993 : Jean-Pierre Sentier in L’Église
Bernard Alane in La Jalousie
Michel Duchaussoy in Pygmalion
Fabrice Eberhard in Romeo and Jeannette  (Roméo et Jeannette)
Michel Etcheverry in Temps contre Temps
 1994 : Roland Blanche in The Resistible Rise of Arturo Ui (La Résistible Ascension d'Arturo Ui)
Roger Dumas in The Homecoming  (Le Retour)
Gérard Hernandez in Le Dîner de Cons
Francis Lax in The Floating Light Bulb  (L'Ampoule magique)
Guy Tréjan in Hamlet
 1995 : Darry Cowl in Baby's Laxative  (On purge bébé) and Madame's Late Mother (Feu la mère de Madame)
Jean-Pierre Darroussin in Un air de famille
Bernard Dhéran in Business is business  (Les Affaires sont les affaires)
Michel Etcheverry in Murder in the Cathedral  (Meurtre dans la cathédrale)
Jean Lescot in Three on the Seesaw 
 1996 : Jean-Paul Roussillon in Mademoiselle Colombe  (Colombe)
Francis Lalanne in Mass Appeal  (L'Affrontement)
Gérard Lartigau in Out of Order  (Panique au Plazza)
François Marthouret in Gertrud
Frédéric van den Driessche in An Ideal Husband (Un mari idéal)
 1997 : Robert Hirsch in Waiting for Godot  (En attendant Godot)
Bernard Alane in Sylvia
Jean-Paul Bordes in A Flea in Her Ear (La Puce à l'oreille)
Jean-Pierre Darroussin in La Terrasse
Jean-Michel Dupuis in Waiting for Godot  (En attendant Godot)
 1998 : Maurice Barrier in Twelve Angry Men (Douze hommes en colère)
Marcel Cuvelier in Bel-Ami
Bernard Freyd in Twelve Angry Men  (Douze hommes en colère)
Samuel Labarthe in Uncle Vanya  (Oncle Vania)
Philippe Laudenbach in Cap and Bells  (Le Bonnet du fou)
 1999 : Michel Aumont in Rêver peut-être
Jean-Michel Dupuis in Les Portes du ciel
André Falcon in A Delicate Balance (Délicate Balance)
Alain MacMoy in Pour la galerie
Jacques Zabor in Mademoiselle Else
 2000 : Marcel Cuvelier in My Father Was Right  (Mon père avait raison)
Bernard Dhéran in Between Worlds (Hôtel des deux mondes)
Christian Hecq in La Main passe
Sam Karmann in Raisons de famille
François Lalande in Raisons de famille
 2001 : Georges Wilson in Cat on a Hot Tin Roof  (Une chatte sur un toit brûlant)
François Lalande in Master Class  (Staline Mélodie)
Philippe Magnan in Les Directeurs
Jean Négroni in Marie Hasparren
Philippe Uchan in Glengarry Glen Ross
 2002 : Maurice Chevit in Conversations with my Father  (Conversations avec mon père)
Stéphane Hillel in It Runs in the Family  (Impair et père)
Philippe Magnan in Elvire
Wojtek Pszoniak in The Shop Around the Corner   (La boutique au coin de la rue)
Michel Vuillermoz in Madame Sans Gêne
 2003 : Michel Duchaussoy in Phèdre
Roger Dumas in Hysteria
Vincent Elbaz in Hysteria
Gérard Loussine in Un petit jeu sans conséquence
José Paul in Un petit jeu sans conséquence
 2004 : Thierry Frémont in Signé Dumas
Philippe Khorsand in L'Invité
Roland Marchisio in Portrait de famille
Jean-Michel Martial in Driving Miss Daisy  (Miss Daisy et son chauffeur)
Chick Ortega in Things We Do for Love (L'Amour est enfant de salaud)
 2005 : Maurice Chevit in Brooklyn Boy
Gérard Caillaud in Amadeus
Éric Elmosnino in Ivanov
José Paul in The Mistress of the Inn  (La Locandiera)
Gilles Privat in To Whom It May Concern  (Avis aux intéressés)
Michel Vuillermoz in Le Menteur
 2006 : Roger Dumas in Moins 2
Didier Brice in La Sainte Catherine
Henri Courseaux in Pygmalion
Jean-Paul Farré in King Lear  (Le Roi Lear)
Jérôme Kircher in King Lear  (Le Roi Lear)
Jean-Pierre Lorit in Créanciers
 2007 : Éric Ruf in Cyrano de Bergerac
Jean-Michel Dupuis in La Danse de l'Albatros
Jean-François Guilliet in Lady Windermere's Fan (L'Éventail de Lady Windermere)
Samuel Labarthe in The Caretaker  (Le Gardien)
Jacques Marchand in Chocolat Piment
 2008 : Gilles Privat in Hotel Paradiso  (L'Hôtel du libre échange)
Didier Brice in Les Forains
Jean-Pierre Malo in Sight Unseen  (En toute confiance)
Laurent Stocker in Juste la fin du monde
 2009 : Roland Bertin in Coriolanus  (Coriolan)
 Sébastien Castro in Le Comique
 Jean-Claude Durand in Le Jour se lève, Léopold !
 Guillaume Gallienne in Fantasio
 Arthur Jugnot in A Pig in a Poke  (Chat en poche)
 Sébastien Thiéry in Cochons d'Inde
 Nicolas Vaude in Elle t'attend
 2010 : Henri Courseaux in Twelfth Night (La Nuit des rois)
 Xavier Gallais in Ordet (Ordet (La Parole))
 José Paul in L’Illusion conjugale
 Yves Pignot in Twelfth Night (La Nuit des rois)
 Gilles Privat in The Girl from Maxim's (La Dame de chez Maxim)
 Hugues Quester in Casimir and Caroline (Casimir et Caroline)
 2011 : Guillaume Gallienne in A Fly in the Ointment (Un fil à la patte)
 Maxime d'Aboville in Henri IV, le bien aimé
 Jean-Michel Dupuis in Le Prénom
 Thierry Hancisse in A Fly in the Ointment (Un fil à la patte)
 Guillaume de Tonquédec in Le Prénom
 Bernard Verley in Autumn Dream (Rêve d'automne)
 2014 : Davy Sardou in Mass Appeal (L’Affrontement)
 John Arnold in Perturbation
 David Ayala in Le dernier jour du jeûne
 Patrick Catalifo in Un temps de chien 
 Manuel Le Lièvre in The Winter's Tale (Le Conte d’hiver)
 Stéphan Wojtowicz in A Monkey in Winter (Un singe en hiver)
 2015 : Thierry Frémont in House of Cards (Les Cartes du pouvoir)
 Urbain Cancelier in Le Système
 Florian Choquart in La discreta enamorada (La Discrète amoureuse)
 Romain Cottard in Comment vous racontez la partie 
 Arthur Igual in Le Capital et son Singe
 Éric Laugérias in Nelson
 2016 : Didier Brice in Taking Sides (À torts et à raisons)
 Jean-Michel Dupuis in Le Mensonge
 Pierre-François Garel in Who's Afraid of Virginia Woolf? (Qui a peur de Virginia Woolf ?)
 Sébastien Thiéry in Momo 
 Thierry Lopez in Avanti !
 2017 : Pierre Forest in Edmond 
 Jean-Paul Bordes in Vient de paraître
 Jacques Fontanel in The Apartment (La Garçonnière)
 Gilles Privat in Time and the Room  (Le Temps et la chambre)
 Patrick Raynal in La Louve
 Didier Sandre in La caduta degli dei (Les Damnés)
 2018 : Franck Desmedt in Adieu Monsieur Haffmann 
 Jean-Paul Comart in Michel-Ange et les fesses de Dieu
 Vincent Deniard in Baby
 Didier Sandre in Scapin the Schemer  (Les Fourberies de Scapin)
 François Siener in Michel-Ange et les fesses de Dieu
 Bruno Solo in Baby

External links
 Official website 

French theatre awards
French awards
Molière